Trevor Hofbauer (born 8 March 1992 in Burnaby, British Columbia) is a Canadian long-distance runner.

Career
In 2017, Hofbauer competed at the 2017 IAAF World Cross Country Championships in Kampala, Uganda and finished in 71st place in a time of 31:43. In 2019, Hofbauer won the Canadian Championships as part of the Toronto Waterfront Marathon, by breaking his personal best by more than seven minutes and falling below Olympic standard. In May 2020, Hofbauer became one of the first three athletes named to Canada's 2020 Olympics team. Hofbauer currently resides and trains in Guelph, Ontario.

References

External links
 

1992 births
Living people
Canadian male long-distance runners
Canadian male marathon runners
Sportspeople from Burnaby
Athletes (track and field) at the 2020 Summer Olympics
Olympic track and field athletes of Canada
21st-century Canadian people